Nangong Kuo ( commonly known as Nan Rong and also known by his courtesy name Zirong and as Nangong Tao, was a major disciple of Confucius. Commending Nangong Kuo as a gentleman of virtue, Confucius gave the student his niece in marriage.

Life
Nangong Kuo was a native of the state of Lu. His dates of birth and death are not known.

The Analects (14.5) records Nangong Kuo's observation that Hou Yi and Ao, powerful military leaders, both ended up being killed; while Yu the Great and Hou Ji, men who took care of the land, ended up with "possession of the world." Confucius commended Nangong as a junzi, a gentleman of virtue. He gave his niece, the daughter of his elder brother Mengpi, to Nangong in marriage.

When Nangong Kuo was serving Duke Ai of Lu, a fire broke out at the palace. While others attempted to secure the contents of the treasury, Nangong focussed on saving the palace library. He was then credited with the preservation of the state's copy of the Rites of Zhou, among other ancient texts.

Nangong Jingshu
Some scholars identify Nangong Kuo with Nangong Jingshu, the younger son of Meng Xizi, head of the powerful Mengsun clan of Lu, but this identification is disputed by others. Meng Xizi was an admirer of Confucius and, on his deathbed, he urged his two sons, Meng Yizi and Nangong Jingshu, to study with the Master, which they did. Nangong Jingshu was largely responsible for Confucius' journey to the court of the Zhou king to study the rites and songs there.

Posthumous titles
During the Tang dynasty, Emperor Xuanzong posthumously awarded Nangong Kuo the title of Count of Tan. During the Song dynasty, he was further awarded the titles of Marquis of Gongqiu and Marquis of Ruyang.

References

Citations

Bibliography

Year of birth unknown
Year of death unknown
Disciples of Confucius
5th-century BC Chinese philosophers
Philosophers from Lu (state)
5th-century BC Chinese people